Matthew Scott Porter (born July 14, 1979) is an American actor and occasional singer known for his role as Jason Street in the NBC television drama Friday Night Lights. His character was injured during a football game in the pilot episode and became disabled. The character was inspired by high school football player David Edwards.

Porter was paired with Alyson Michalka and Vanessa Hudgens in the 2009 film Bandslam. He performed the song "Pretend", which is featured on the Bandslam soundtrack. In 2010, he played the role of law firm investigator Blake Calamar in CBS' legal drama The Good Wife.

He starred as George Tucker in The CW comedy-drama series Hart of Dixie.

Background 

Porter was born in Omaha, Nebraska and attended Lake Howell High School in Winter Park, Florida. At Lake Howell, he was a wide receiver on the football team and graduated in 1997. While a student at the University of Central Florida, he sang vocal percussion in an a cappella vocal group, 4:2:Five (currently known as VoicePlay). Porter also worked as a baby-sitter and "didn't have time to party."

Career

Prior to joining the cast of Friday Night Lights, Porter played Matthew in the original cast of the Off-Broadway hit Altar Boyz in 2004. In 2006, he temporarily took over the role of Casey Hughes in the soap opera As the World Turns, a role originally performed by Zach Roerig. Porter also played the role of Colin Thompson, the more visible part of the duo that fronts the fictional band PoP!, in the movie Music and Lyrics (2007).

Porter also played the character Rex in the film Speed Racer (2008), which was directed and written by the Wachowskis. He played Bobby in the remake of Prom Night and Ben Wheatly in Bandslam, released in August 2009. That same year, he was paired with The Sisterhood of the Traveling Pants star Alexis Bledel in the romantic comedy film The Good Guy, which premiered at the Tribeca Film Festival.

Porter is a fan of comic books and has auditioned for several comic book hero roles. He is a fan of HeroClix, filming unboxing videos of upcoming sets for the WizKids Facebook page. Porter performed and sang the song "Someone to Fall Back On" in Bandslam, and his song "Pretend" was included in the soundtrack. He was part of his high school's choral department and was a founding member of the groups 4:2:Five and Mosaic. He eventually performed for Off Broadway with another a cappella band, Toxic Audio.

Porter portrayed "Randy" in the 2010 film Dear John, which was adapted from the novel of the same name by Nicholas Sparks.

In 2010, Porter joined the cast of CBS's legal drama The Good Wife as Blake Calamar, an investigator for Lockhart & Gardner, a law firm. His character appeared in 14 episodes. Also in 2010, he starred in the pilot of the television series Nomads, which was developed for The CW, but it was not picked up by the network. BuddyTV ranked him #10 on its "TV's 100 Sexiest Men of 2010" list and #34 in 2011.

Porter played a lawyer in the medical dramedy series Hart of Dixie alongside Rachel Bilson. The series debuted on The CW in September 2011.

In 2013, he debuted in the second season of the video game series of The Walking Dead by Telltale Games as Luke, one of the main characters in the series. Porter also voiced another main character, Lukas, in Minecraft Story Mode by Telltale Games and Mojang. In 2017, Porter portrayed Colton "Colt" Cruise in the EA Sports game Madden NFL 18 Longshot mode.

Personal life
In April 2013, Porter married casting director Kelsey Mayfield, a former University of Texas cheerleader whom he met on the set of Friday Night Lights. One of his groomsmen was screenwriter and director Jamie Linden, a schoolmate at Lake Howell. In May 2015, Mayfield gave birth to their son, McCoy Lee. Their daughter, Clover Ash was born in August 2017.

Filmography

Film

Television

Video games

Off-broadway

References

External links

Video Feature: In Rehearsal: Altar Boyz at Broadway.com
Video Feature: Opening Night: Altar Boyz at Broadway.com
Scott Porter - marriage
Scott Porter at NBC

1979 births
21st-century American male actors
Living people
American male film actors
American male musical theatre actors
American male television actors
American male video game actors
American male voice actors
Male actors from Omaha, Nebraska
Male actors from Florida
Musicians from Florida
People from Winter Park, Florida
University of Central Florida alumni